St John Ambulance is the name of a number of affiliated organisations in different countries which teach and provide first aid and emergency medical services, and are primarily staffed by volunteers. The associations are overseen by the international Order of St John and its priories (national branches).

History
The first such organisation to be founded was the St John Ambulance Association, which was founded in 1877 in England. Its first uniformed first-aiders were founded in 1887 as the St John Ambulance Brigade. These two have since been merged into a single association. St John Ambulance now have over 40 national organisations, many of which are affiliated with Johanniter International, and over 500,000 volunteers worldwide.

The Order of St John owns the brand name in most countries (with the notable exception of India, which has a St John Ambulance organisation that is unconnected to the international movement). Logos vary in different countries but always contain the eight-pointed white Maltese cross as the essential identifier. Like the Order, St John Ambulance associations accept members of all religions. Their geographic organisation differs from the Order, and they have to contend with the differing national laws, medical practices and cultures of countries. As a result, the role and organisation of St John Ambulance varies by country.

Organisation 
The legal status of each organisation varies by country, province, state, county, territory and municipality. In both England and Wales the resident St John Ambulance organisations are simultaneously but separately registered as charities and companies, whereas St John Ambulance South Africa (for example) is a distinct entity registered as a "public benefit organisation".

The presence of St John Ambulance is different among countries:

St John Ambulance were traditionally organised with military-style ranks. Some associations have replaced these with civilian titles (e.g. Unit Manager, Superintendent).

Johanniter International

In the aftermath of World War II, British soldiers established Saint John brigades in Germany. In cooperation with the Johanniter Orden (the Protestant German Order of Saint John), the Johanniter-Unfall-Hilfe was founded in 1952. In recent years, more national Saint John societies, not directly linked to the British St John Ambulance, have been founded in Europe, notably in Austria, Denmark, Sweden and Poland.

At the international meeting of the governing bodies of the Orders of Saint John in the course of celebrations to mark the Order's 90th anniversary in 1999, the idea to cooperate more intensively within Europe was born.  As a result, Johanniter International (JOIN) today links sixteen national Saint John organisations all over Europe.

Relationship with the Order

The Order of Saint John, formally the Most Venerable Order of the Hospital of Saint John of Jerusalem is an international order of chivalry which is headquartered in the United Kingdom. The Order founded the St John Ambulance associations and oversees their work. They also own the rights to the St John name and brand, including the Maltese Cross logo. The Order also oversee the St John Eye Hospital Group, which is separate to the ambulance associations. Most members of St John Ambulance are not themselves members of the Order, and vice versa, so a major presence of the Order does not dictate a major presence of St John Ambulance.

Key dates
 10 July 1877: St John Ambulance Association formed to teach first-aid in large railway centres and mining districts.
 June 1887: St John Ambulance Brigade is formed as a uniformed organisation to provide a First Aid and Ambulance services at public events.
 14 May 1888: British Order of St John is granted royal charter by Queen Victoria.
 1908: By mutual agreement with St Andrew's Ambulance Association, St John Ambulance Association ceased operating in Scotland but the Order continued to operate.
 1974 The St John Ambulance Association and The St John Ambulance Brigade amalgamated to form the present St John Ambulance Foundation
 1999: The Order of St John celebrated its 90th anniversary worldwide

See also
Topics related to St John Ambulance and the Order:
 St John Ambulance Ranks and Insignia
 St John Ambulance Cadets in the UK
 Service Medal of the Order of St John
Similar movements:
 Johanniter-Unfall-Hilfe (Germany)
 International Red Cross and Red Crescent Movement (international)
 Sovereign Military Order of Malta (international)
 Order of Malta Ambulance Corps (Ireland)
 St. Andrew's First Aid (Scotland)
 Street medic

References

External links
 St John International – official website
 Museum of St John in Clerkenwell, London
 Annual inspection of Birmingham's St. John's Ambulance Brigade & Nursing Corps. by Maj.-Gen. Sir P. Wilkinson, 1928 (Pathé Newsreel)

 
International organisations based in London
Ambulance services